Sweetapple is the charitable brand, creative consultancy and production company established by Elaine and Matthew Sweetapple.

Based in London, since 2002 Sweetapple has been responsible for creating and giving ideas to charities which have raised over £1,000,000 for the causes concerned. These have included Peeball, for the Prostate Cancer Charity (UK), CANSA (South Africa) and the Australian Prostate Cancer Foundation, 'Remember Me' for the road crash victim's charity, RoadPeace (UK), the ecological musical story, Rockford's Rock Opera, written with Steve Punt – which includes several charity partners including WWF, Buglife and Missing Persons – 'DogMob' for Battersea Dog's Home, and 'GiveSure' Charitable Insurance.

Although it remains a commercial marketing, production and PR consultancy, the organisation's charitable works have developed a wider profile, winning several UK national awards; these include the Institute of Public Relations "Outstanding Achievement Award" and PRWeek magazine's "Best Not for Profit" awards.

Peeball 

Peeballs are biodegradable compacted-powder balls that can be collected, or placed in gentlemen's urinals and destroyed using the power of the urinary stream. Peeball is available in many retail outlets including the Mitchells & Butlers and Scottish & Newcastle pub chains, Virgin Megastores, River Island, Maplin and Ryman, and via the web. In the UK, Peeballs cost £1.00 with at least 30p of which going directly to the Prostate Cancer Charity.

Peeball was conceived as 'a new approach to charitable awareness and fund raising – an alternative to the worthy-but-dull badges and key rings that have become the mainstay of charity in retail'. It was created to engage and amuse but also to highlight issues that would never usually be discussed socially or in mainstream media. Peeball has used schoolboy humour to help communicate serious health and awareness messages. The game has been featured on national TV (on This Morning), in radio programmes (including Radio One's Mark and Lard 'playing' the game on air and a feature on the Steve Wright Show), newspapers, magazines and the local press. In addition, the Peeball on-line game has been played more than 26,000,000 times. As a result of its success in the UK – Peeball has been adopted for launch by several other national prostate cancer charities.

Over 500,000 Peeballs have been sold in the UK raising over £150,000 for The Prostate Cancer Charity

In July 2015 Peeball was launched in Australia by Chemist Warehouse store group and supported by the AFL Coaches Association.

Remember Me 

The 'Remember Me' campaign for RoadPeace – the UK road accident victims charity – was launched on 31 August 2003.   The 'Remember Me' Weeping Flower sign was created by Sweetapple and given to the charity mainly to provide a permanent memorial to lives lost or blighted through road crashes. It was also intended to provide a poignant warning to other road users regarding the everyday risks of road use.

Since its launch over 3,000 Remember Me signs have been placed on Britain's roads and the Weeping Flower image has been used to front various RoadPeace campaigns. These have included projecting the image onto City Hall in London and using it to highlight the connection between Safety Cameras and road deaths by Transport for London.

Rockford's Rock Opera 
 

Rockford's Rock Opera is an ecological musical story created by Sweetapple with Steve Punt.

Rockford's Rock Opera audio visual resources and audiobook are used to teach about extinction, ecology and biodiversity. Recommended by many education portals including the BGCI, Woodland's Junior School and Teachernet, it from educational circles, with reviews in The Times, The Guardian and Primary Times and personal appearances on BBC Radio.

The musical introduces the Island of Infinity, home to the last single representative of every extinct animal and plant species. Key characters include the fictional Cocklebur Ick (named after the cocklebur seed – inspiration for the invention of Velcro), the Registrar, Dectopus and The Herculous. Also featured are non-fictional species such as the passenger pigeon, great auk, moa and thylacine.

Rockford's Rock Opera is described as an "Adventure in Sound", citing influences such as The Hitchhiker's Guide to the Galaxy, Jeff Wayne's War of the Worlds, Butterfly Ball and The Point!. Utilizing all the advantages of web delivery, Rockford's Rock Opera was described by The Guardian as an "ingenious... thoroughly modern musical" and, by The Times, as a "cult favourite as beloved as Wallace and Gromit." The musical story's on-line and on-mobile formats allow visitors access a variety of free audio visual materials and resources as well as different story formats (including pdf and audio downloads). On the Apple iPhone and iPod Touch, Rockford's Rock Opera (Part One) is available as a free app.

Rockford's Rock Opera ecological messages and content have led to cooperative links with environmental organisations and charities including the WWF, Buglife and the BGCI.

Following many school performances, it has been performed live on stage at various venues including the Museum of London and The Bull Theatre in London.

Rockford's Rock Opera grew from the success of a song released by Sweetapple with the help of Gerry Bron on behalf of Battersea Dogs and Cats Home called "Rockford's Christmas" which entered the UK singles chart in 2004.

DogMob 

DogMob was created with Mobstar Media for Battersea Dogs and Cats Home.

Dogmob allows customers to download mobile phone content – images, screensavers, mobile wallpapers, ringtones – and 'thank you' messages featuring Battersea Dogs currently looking for homes. The concept created a link between the charity and payments for popular dog related mobile content.

Supporters visit the DogMob site, select the Battersea Dog they’d like to adopt, and then text the dog's name to a 'short code' number. (There's a choice of four dogs on the site at any time – updated regularly as they find homes – together with information about them and how they came to the Dog's Home.)

Customers are then sent a link to a wapsite where they can download four pieces of content – an animated screensaver, wallpaper certificate, a 'thank you' video and barking ringtone.

Customers can also register for free news updates about their adopted dog.

GiveSure 

GiveSure is a UK insurance service that gives money to charity each time someone buys a policy.

Launched in the UK in 2006, Givesure offers car, home, van and bike insurance. Rather than doing its own underwriting, Givesure is backed by a broker, which searches the underwriting market for competitive quotes.

For every policy bought or renewed through Givesure the broker makes a donation to charity of £20 or 10% of the premium, whichever is the greater.

Givesure is able to make the charitable donations without loading customers' premiums. This is because it does not spend money on marketing and advertising. The money the company will save from not doing this is passed on to charity.

References

External links
Sweetapple website

Public relations companies of the United Kingdom

pt:Rockford's Rock Opera